A Frost diagram or Frost–Ebsworth diagram is a type of graph used by inorganic chemists in electrochemistry to illustrate the relative stability of a number of different oxidation states of a particular substance. The graph illustrates the free energy vs oxidation state of a chemical species. This effect is dependent on pH, so this parameter also must be included. The free energy is determined by the oxidation–reduction half-reactions. The Frost diagram allows easier comprehension of these reduction potentials than the earlier-designed Latimer diagram, because the “lack of additivity of potentials” was confusing. The Frost diagram is named after , who originally invented it as a way to "show both free energy and oxidation potential data conveniently" in a 1951 paper.

pH dependence

The pH dependence is given by the factor −0.059m/n per pH unit, where m relates to the number of protons in the equation, and n the number of electrons exchanged. Electrons are always exchanged in electrochemistry, but not necessarily protons. If there is no proton exchange in the reaction equilibrium, the reaction is said to be pH-independent. This means that the values for the electrochemical potential rendered in a redox half-reaction, whereby the elements in question change oxidation states are the same whatever the pH conditions under which the procedure is carried out.

The Frost diagram is also a useful tool for comparing the trends of standard potentials (slope) of acidic and basic solutions. The pure, neutral element transitions to different compounds depending whether the species is in acidic and basic pHs. Though the value and amount of oxidation states remain unchanged, the free energies can vary greatly. The Frost diagram allows the superimposition of acidic and basic graphs for easy and convenient comparison.

Unit and scale 
The standard free-energy scale is measured in electron-volts, and the nE° = 0 value is usually the pure, neutral element. The Frost diagram normally shows free-energy values above and below nE° = 0 and is scaled in integers. The y axis of the graph displays the free energy. Increasing stability (lower free energy) is lower on the graph, so the higher free energy and higher on the graph an element is, the more unstable and reactive it is.

The oxidation state of the element is shown on the x axis of the Frost diagram. Oxidation states are unitless and are also scaled in positive and negative integers. Most often, the Frost diagram displays oxidation number in increasing order, but in some cases it is displayed in decreasing order. The neutral, pure element with a free energy of zero (nE° = 0) also has an oxidation state equal to zero. However, the energy of some allotropes may not be zero.

The slope of the line therefore represents the standard potential between two oxidation states. In other words, the steepness of the line shows the tendency for those two reactants to react and form the lowest-energy product. There is a possibility of having either a positive or negative slope. A positive slope between two species indicates a tendency for an oxidation reaction, while a negative slope between two species indicates a tendency for reduction. For example, if the manganese in [HMnO4]− has an oxidation state of +6 and nE° = 4, and in MnO2 the oxidation state is +4 and nE° = 0, then the slope Δy/Δx is 4/2 = 2, yielding the standard potential of +2. The stability of any terms can be similarly found by this graph.

Gradient
The gradient of the line between any two points on a Frost diagram gives the potential for the reaction. A species that lies in a peak, above the gradient of the two points on either side, denotes a species unstable with respect to disproportionation, and a point that falls below the gradient of the line joining its two adjacent points lies in a thermodynamic sink, and is intrinsically stable.

Axes
The axes of the Frost diagram show (horizontally) the oxidation state of the species in question and (vertically) the electron exchange number multiplied by the voltage (nE) or the Gibbs free energy per unit of the Faraday constant, ΔG/F.

Disproportionation and comproportionation 
In regards to electrochemical reactions, two main types of reactions can be visualized using the Frost diagram. Comproportionation is when two equivalents of an element, differing in oxidation number, combine to form a product with an intermediate oxidation number. Disproportionation is the opposite reaction, in which two equivalents of an element, identical in oxidation number, react to form two products of differing oxidation numbers.

Disproportionation: 2 Mn+ → Mm+ + Mp+.

Comproportionation: Mm+ + Mp+ → 2 Mn+.

2 n = m + p in both examples.

Using a Frost diagram, one can predict whether one oxidation number would undergo disproportionation or two oxidation numbers would undergo comproportionation. Looking at two slopes among a set of three oxidation numbers on the diagram, assuming the two standard potentials (slopes) are not equal, the middle oxidation will either be in a “hill” or “valley” form. A hill is formed when the left slope is steeper than the right, and a valley is formed when the right slope is steeper than the left. An oxidation number that is on “top of the hill” tends to favor disproportionation into the adjacent oxidation states. The adjacent oxidation states, however, will favor comproportionation if the middle oxidation state is in the “bottom of a valley”.

Criticisms/discrepancies 
Arthur Frost stated in his own original publication that there may be potential criticism for his Frost diagram. He predicts that “the slopes may not be as easily or accurately recognized as they are the direct numerical values of the oxidation potentials [of the Latimer diagram]”. Many inorganic chemists use both the Latimer and Frost diagrams in tandem, using the Latimer for quantitative data, and then converting those data into a Frost diagram for visualization. Frost suggested that the numerical values of standard potentials could be added next to the slopes to provide supplemental information.

In a paper published in the Journal of Chemical Education, Martinez de Ilarduya and Villafañe (1994) warn users of Frost diagrams to be aware of the definition of the free energy used to construct the diagrams. In acid-solution graphs, the standard nE° = −ΔG/F is universally used; therefore all sources’ acid-solution Frost diagrams will be identical. However, various textbooks show discrepancies in the Frost diagram of an element, in regards to the energy. Some textbooks use the reduction potential, E°(2  + 2 /H2), defined in an acid-solution for a basic-solution. In the Phillips and Williams Inorganic Chemistry textbook, however, another reduction potential is used for the basic solutions given by the following formula: E°(OH) = E°b − E°(2 H2O + 2 /H2 + 2 OH−) = E°b + 0.828 V. This other way of presenting reduction potentials is used in some textbooks and not in others, but is not always explicitly indicated on the graph, creating confusion for the reader. So, users of the Frost diagram should be aware of the problem, and should always be clearly informed on which free-energy scale their diagrams are based.

See also
 Pourbaix diagram
 Ellingham diagram

References

External links
Diagrams That Provide Useful Oxidation-Reduction Information

Electrochemistry